The 2015 Porsche Mobil 1 Supercup season was the 23rd Porsche Supercup season. It began on 10 May at Circuit de Catalunya and finished on 25 october at Circuit of the Americas, after eleven scheduled races, all of which were support events for the 2015 Formula One season.

Teams and drivers
Full list of drivers that participated in the 2015 season:

Race calendar and results
Full list of races that held during the 2015 season:

Notes

Calendar changes
 The series was scheduled to run in support of the German Grand Prix, at a venue that, at the time of the calendar's publication, had not yet been decided. However, with the cancellation of the German Grand Prix, the planned Porsche Supercup meeting was similarly suspended. It was replaced by additional races at Spa-Francorchamps and Monza.

Championship standings

Drivers' Championship

Notes
† – Drivers did not finish the race, but were classified as they completed over 75% of the race distance.

Notes

References

External links
 
 Porsche Mobil 1 Supercup Online Magazine

Porsche Supercup seasons
Porsche Supercup